John Wong (born 6 June 1968) is a Malaysian prelate of the Catholic Church. He was named the second metropolitan Archbishop of Kota Kinabalu on 24 January 2013, the Feast of St Francis de Sales, by Pope Francis. He is fully styled as His Grace Most Reverend Datuk John Wong, Archbishop of Kota Kinabalu. Sacred Heart Cathedral in the metropolitan of Kota Kinabalu is the seat of Archbishop Wong, and the cathedral church of the Roman Catholic Archdiocese of Kota Kinabalu.

Coat of Arms

Early life and ministry

Family 
John Wong was born as the 7th of 11 children (five brothers and five sisters) on 6 June 1968 at his hometown, Karamunting, Sandakan, Sabah. His father, Paul Wong Shui Tshun, was a hawker selling yong taufu (stuffed bean curd) and fish balls at Sandakan Central Market, while his mother, Rose Chung Thiem Yin was a housewife.

Vocation 
Before his seminary formation from 1992 to 1998 at St. Peter's College, Kuching, Sarawak, Wong worked as a salesman from 1987 to 1990. He was ordained a deacon on 8 January 1998 at the Sacred Heart Cathedral and ordained a priest on 22 January 1999 at St. Mary's Church (now Cathedral) by Bishop John Lee.

The late Fr Tobias Chi, the then parish rector of the church in Sandakan, had much influence in his consideration of the priestly vocation, whilst being present during his ordinations. Wong served as assistant parish priest of Sacred Heart Cathedral from 1999 to 2002.

He then continued to study for a licentiate in Carmelite spirituality for two years at the Pontifical Theological Faculty "Teresianum" in Rome, Italy. On his return in 2004, he was appointed as rector of the Catholic Diocesan Centre in Penampang and director of the aspirants until his appointment as archbishop of Kota Kinabalu.

Episcopal ministry

Appointment 
He was rushing to the Bundu Tuhan Retreat Centre at Kundasang on 7 June 2010, a day after his 42nd Birthday, to attend a week-long seminar there. Among the unopened mail he brought along was a letter with a Bangkok post mark, the city where the office of the Apostolic Nuncio of Pope Benedict XVI was located.

He found time to read the letter, and to his shock it informed him of his appointment. He spent the next two days in reflection before answering the call. A few weeks later, on 21 June 2010, Pope Benedict XVI officially appointed him as the Coadjutor Archbishop of Kota Kinabalu.

Ordinations 
His episcopal ordination took place on 1 October 2010. This made him one of the youngest candidates as shepherd in Malaysia, Singapore and Brunei.

Due to the mandatory resignation age of 75 of Archbishop John Lee, on 1 December 2012, Wong was appointed as the 2nd Metropolitan Archbishop of Kota Kinabalu and formally installed on 24 January 2013, just a month after his appointment.

The motto for Wong's episcopacy is "Iman, Kasih, Harapan" (Faith, Love, Hope), a reminder on the growth of the faithful, charitable works, and abounding hope, in fulfilling the mission and vision of the Archdiocese.

Actions 
In his tenure as shepherd, he launched the Kadazan Audible Bible together with the former Apostolic Nuncio to Malaysia, Most Rev Joseph Marino, at Holy Family Church, Telipok, in 2016.

The proposal of a RM9.6 Million project to build the new Catholic Centre was made in 2018. It has completed the construction of the new Catholic Centre adjacent to the Sacred Heart Cathedral, at the location of a former Chinese primary school. It was officially blessed in early 2021 and Opened by the Apostolic Nuncio of Malaysia, Wojciech Załuski in November 2022

He was also the main celebrant and spiritual head of celebrations in the first virtual and 5th edition of Sabah Youth Day, originally planned for 2020 but pushed forward to July 2021 due to the pandemic. It brought together more than 2,500 catholic youths from around Sabah and some from other dioceses in an online setting to discuss catholic youth life in Sabah.

Honours 
He has received the award of the Commander of the Order of Kinabalu (PGDK) which carries the title "Datuk" from current Sabah Head of State Tuan Yang di-Pertua Tun Datuk Seri Panglima Dr Juhar Mahiruddin on 1 October 2016, coinciding with his 6th Episcopal Ordination Anniversary.

Honours of Sabah 

 Sabah : Commander of the Order of Kinabalu (P.G.D.K.) (2016)

References

External links 

 Catholic-Hierarchy.org
 Archdiocese of Kota Kinabalu
 Archbishop

1968 births
21st-century Roman Catholic archbishops in Malaysia
Malaysian people of Hakka descent
Living people
People from Sabah